Petar Yordanov Velichkov (8 August 1940 – 15 July 1993) was a Bulgarian football midfielder who played for Bulgaria in the 1962 FIFA World Cup. He also played for Slavia Sofia.

Honours

Club
Slavia Sofia
Bulgarian Cup (2): 1962–63, 1963–64

International
Bulgaria U18
European Under-18 Championship: 1959

References

External links
FIFA profile

1940 births
1993 deaths
Bulgarian footballers
Bulgaria international footballers
Association football midfielders
PFC Slavia Sofia players
First Professional Football League (Bulgaria) players
1962 FIFA World Cup players